= Maintenance requirement (biology) =

The maintenance requirement in biology is typically defined as the minimum quantities of foods of various types needed to sustain the necessary biological processes in an animal without it gaining or losing body mass or changes in composition of its body, but crucially not including food needed for growth or reproductive functions.
